Solanum ovum-fringillae is a species of plant in the family Solanaceae. It is endemic to Brazil.

References

Flora of Brazil
ovum-fringillae
Critically endangered plants
Taxonomy articles created by Polbot